3,4-Methylenedioxy-N,N-dimethylamphetamine (MDDM) is a lesser-known research chemical. It is also the N,N-dimethyl analog of 3,4-methylenedioxyamphetamine (MDA). MDDM was first synthesized by Alexander Shulgin. In his book PiHKAL (Phenethylamines i Have Known And Loved), the dosage is unspecified and the duration unknown. MDDM produces only mild effects that are not well characterized in PiHKAL.  Very little data exists about the pharmacological properties, metabolism, and toxicity of MDDM. This compound is however occasionally encountered as an impurity in 3,4-methylenedioxy-N-methylamphetamine (MDMA) which has been synthesized by methylation of MDA using methylating reagents such as methyl iodide.  An excess of reagent or a reaction temperature that is too high results in some double methylation of the amine nitrogen, yielding MDDM as well as MDMA.  The presence of MDDM as an impurity can thus reveal which synthetic route was used to manufacture seized samples of MDMA.

Legality

United Kingdom
This substance is a Class A drug in the Drugs controlled by the UK Misuse of Drugs Act.

See also 
 Phenethylamine
 MDMA
 MDA
 Dimethylone

References

External links 
 MDDM entry in PiHKAL

Substituted amphetamines
Benzodioxoles